Strange Wine is a 1978 short story collection by American writer Harlan Ellison.

Contents
The book contains the following stories (as well as Ellison's own introduction for each tale):

"Introduction: Revealed at Last! What Killed the Dinosaurs! And You Don't Look So Terrific Yourself"
"Croatoan"
"Working With the Little People"
"Killing Bernstein" 
"Mom" 
"In Fear of K" 
"Hitler Painted Roses" 
"The Wine Has Been Left Open Too Long and the Memory Has Gone Flat" 
"From A to Z, in the Chocolate Alphabet"
"Lonely Women are the Vessels of Time"
"Emissary from Hamelin"
"The New York Review of Bird"
"Seeing" 
"The Boulevard of Broken Dreams"
"Strange Wine" 
"The Diagnosis of Dr. D'arqueAngel"

Reception
Ellison wrote "Strange Wine" while sitting in the window of Westwood-area science fiction bookstore, A Change of Hobbit.

Stephen King considered this one of the best horror fiction books published between 1950 and 1980 in his 1981 non-fiction book about the horror genre, Danse Macabre, specifically reviewing the stories "Croatoan", "Hitler Painted Roses", "Lonely Women are the Vessels of Time", "Emissary from Hamelin" and "From A to Z, in the Chocolate Alphabet".

External links
http://www.islets.net/collections/strangewine.html

1978 short story collections
Short story collections by Harlan Ellison